Bob and Mike Bryan successfully defended their title, defeating Eric Butorac and Jean-Julien Rojer in the finals 6–7(6–8), 6–2, [10–7]. The twin brothers set a record of 62 career doubles titles on the ATP Tour, surpassing The Woodies (Todd Woodbridge and Mark Woodforde). Rojer, who was a UCLA tennis player (1999-2002), returned to play on his college home court.

Seeds

Draw

Draw

External links
 Doubles draw

Doubles